Augustino Oldoini (6 January 1612 – 23 March 1683, at Perugia) was an Italian Jesuit teacher, church historian and bibliographer.

He came from La Spezia, and entered the Society of Jesus on 4 February 1628. At the end of his novitiate he made the usual study of the humanities, philosophy and theology. For some time he taught classics at Perugia, and was then professor of moral philosophy in the theological school.

Writings
His first work, "Alcune difficoltà principali della grammatica" (Ancona, 1637), dealing with Latin grammar, was written while he was engaged in teaching the humanities. He devoted his later years to the study of history and bibliography.

He prepared a new annotated edition of the "History of the Popes" by Alphonsus Ciacconius, up to Clement IX (1667-9), "Vitæ et res gestæ Pontificum Romanorum et S.R.E. Cardinalium Alphonsi Ciacconi, O.P." (4 volumes, Rome, 1670–77).
 
In connection with this he also published the following: "Necrologium Pontificum ac Pseudo-Pontificum Romanorum" (Rome, 1671); "Clementes titulo sanctitatis vel morum sanctimonia illustres" (Perugia, 1675); "Athenæum Romanum, in quo Summorum Pontificum ac Pseudo-Pontificum necnon S.R.E. Cardinalium et Pseudo-Cardinalium scripta publice exponuntur" (Perugia, 1670). J. Meuschen published an excerpt from Oldoini's "Catalogus eorum qui de Romanis Pontificibus scripserunt", in his work "Ceremonialia electionis Pontificum Romanorum" (Frankfort, 1731).
 
Oldoini also published "Athenæum Augustum, in quo Perusinorum scripta publice exponuntur" (Perugia, 1680) and "Athenæum Ligusticum seu Syllabus Scriptorum Ligurum necnon Sarzanensium ac Cyrnensium rei publicæ Genuensis Subditorum" (Perugia, 1680).

References

 

1612 births
1683 deaths
17th-century Italian Jesuits
Historians of the Catholic Church
Italian bibliographers